Cao Xun (231 – September or October 244) was an imperial prince of the state of Cao Wei in the Three Kingdoms period of China. He was an adopted son of Cao Rui, the second emperor of Wei. While the identities of his parents are unknown, Cao Xun was allegedly a son of Cao Kai (曹楷), the son of Cao Zhang (Cao Rui's uncle). On 23 September 235, Cao Rui enfeoffed Cao Xun as the Prince of Qin (秦王). Cao Xun died sometime between 19 September and 18 October 244.

See also
 Lists of people of the Three Kingdoms
 Cao Wei family trees#Cao Rui

Notes

References

 Chen, Shou (3rd century). Records of the Three Kingdoms (Sanguozhi).
 Pei, Songzhi (5th century). Annotations to Records of the Three Kingdoms (Sanguozhi zhu).

Cao Wei imperial princes
231 births
244 deaths